Katavi University of Agriculture is a  public university. It is located in Katavi, Tanzania.

References

Public universities in Tanzania